The W Line is a railroad line owned and operated by the Norfolk Southern Railway in the U.S. states of North Carolina and South Carolina. It runs from Asheville, North Carolina southeasterly via Spartanburg, South Carolina to Columbia, South Carolina, but the portion northwest of Landrum, South Carolina (over the Saluda Grade) has been closed since December 2001.

An April 19, 2014, report from WLOS, the ABC affiliate in Asheville, said that Norfolk Southern was looking to sell or lease the W Line from Asheville to Flat Rock. As of July 9, 2014, NS had entered an agreement to lease out the northern portion of the line to a Watco-owned shortline named the Blue Ridge Southern Railroad:

As was later reported, Norfolk Southern in fact sold this portion of the line to Watco, along with the defunct TR Line that branches from the W Line at Hendersonville, North Carolina and runs west to Pisgah Forest, North Carolina, and another branch line to the west of Asheville. Ownership of the three lines was transferred effective July 26, 2014.

References

Norfolk Southern Railway lines
Rail infrastructure in North Carolina
Rail infrastructure in South Carolina